John R. King may refer to:

John Reed King, American radio and television game show host 
J. Robert King, American author who uses the pen name John R. King